Raden Gondulphus Doeriat  (15 March 1913 – 18 July 1998) was an Indonesian politician from the Catholic Party. He was a member of the People's Representative Council from 1956 until 1960, and later from 1968 until 1971. After the fusion of the party into the Indonesian Democratic Party, he held office as the head of the party from 1976 until 1981, and represented the party in the Supreme Advisory Council from 1978 until 1983.

Early life 
Doeriat was born on 15 March 1913 at Yogyakarta, as the son of Gunowijoyo, a village head in Cepet, located at the slope of Mount Merapi. He was originally named Rabekan. Following Javanese custom, he was renamed after surviving a childhood illness. He went to the Ongko Loro school, the branch of the Taman Siswa in the Tanjung Region. After completing the first grade in the school, in his request, he moved to the Normalschool in Muntilan.

During his time in Muntilan, a plague occurred. Doeriat went back to his house, and his father moved him to another school. He then went to the Hollandsche Indische Kweekschool and graduated in 1934.

Career 
After he graduated from HIK, he was accepted as a teacher in the Katholieke Kweekschool at Muntilan. He was transferred from the school to become the principal of the Schakelschool in Sleman. During his time in Sleman, he rented a boarding house in Yogyakarta. After his marriage with Siti Rabini, Doeriat's parents bought him a home in the Jetis Pakuningratan village, located close to the Tugu Yogyakarta. 

In 1939, after being offered a job by his friend in Batavia, Doeriat moved to the city. There, he joined the Javan Catholic Political Union, and became the secretary of the union. He also taught at the Van Lith Hollandsch-Inlandsche School (Dutch school for indigenous people) in Batavia, and joined the Catholic Scouting.

After the Japanese occupied the Dutch East Indies, Doeriat's wife was ordered by her father to evacuate to her father's house in Boyolali, leaving behind Doeriat in Batavia. On 8 March 1942, the Van Lith school was forcefully closed by the Japanese forces, and Doeriat followed his wife to Boyolali. 

During his time in Boyolali, he was employed as a sinder (supervisor) at a tea plantation owned by the Imperial Japanese Army in Baros Tampir village near Boyolali.

Religious life 
Doeriat was originally a Muslim. His grandfather completed his Hajj pilgrimage in 1925. He converted to Catholic when he was fifth grade.

Notes

Bibliography

References 

Indonesian Roman Catholics
1913 births
1998 deaths
People from Yogyakarta
Members of the People's Representative Council, 1955